Events in the year 2023 in Uruguay.

Incumbents
 President: Luis Lacalle Pou 
 Vice President: Beatriz Argimón

Events

Deaths 
 30 January – Félix Sienra, 107, sailor

Sport 
Association football
 2023 Uruguayan Primera División season
 2023 Uruguayan Segunda División season
 2022 Supercopa Uruguaya
 2023 Campeonato Uruguayo Femenino C season

References 

 
Uruguay
Uruguay
2020s in Uruguay
Years of the 21st century in Uruguay